The 1960–61 Soviet Cup was the seventh edition of the Soviet Cup ice hockey tournament, and the first since 1956. 19 teams participated in the tournament, which was won by CSKA Moscow for the fourth consecutive season.

Tournament

The tournament was set up in five rounds, with six teams paired off in the opening round to advance and the other 13 pre-qualified to the round of 16. Two or three matches were played between pairings in the different rounds of play, with all opening round matches decided by two meetings. Four teams were eliminated from the tournament by failing to play their opponents.

First round 

In the first round, Spartak Omsk defeated Metallurg Novokuznetsk, Spartak Sverdlovsk defeated LIIHT Leningrad, and Kirovez Leningrad defeated Daugava Riga to advance to the round of 16.

1/8 finals 

In the round of 16, Torpedo Gorky beat Spartak Moscow, Traktor Chelyabinsk advanced automatically due to Molot Perm not participating, and SKA Kalinin defeated Krylya Sovetov Moscow. Dynamo Novosibirsk beat Spartak Omsk, who had qualified from the first round play-in, and Kirowez Leningrad advanced by default over the non-participating Spartak Sverdlovsk. Dynamo Moscow lost to Lokomotiv Moscow, SKA Leningrad to Gorod Elektrostal, and Lhimik Voskresensk to the eventual champions CSKA Moscow.

Quarterfinals

In the quarter finals, Torpedo Gorky and SKA Kalinin advanced over the non-participating Traktor Chelyabinsk and Dynamo Novosibirsk respectively, while Kirovez Leningrad lost to Lokomotiv Moscow, and Gorod Elektrostal lost to champions CSKA Moscow.

Semifinals 

In the semifinal matchups, Torpedo Gorky beat SKA Kalinin in three matches, 3-4, 4-3, 6-4, while Lokomotiv Moscow lost to CSKA Moscow in two, 2-7 and 1-6.

Final

In the finals, CSKA Moscow defeated Torpedo Gorky in three, 5-1, 15-4, 6-3.

External links
 Season on hockeyarchives.info
 Season on hockeyarchives.ru

Soviet Cup (ice hockey) seasons
Cup